Allegany County Public Schools is a public school district serving Allegany County, Maryland, United States.

High schools
 Allegany High School, Cumberland
 Fort Hill High School, Cumberland
 Mountain Ridge High School, Frostburg

Middle schools
 Braddock Middle School, Cumberland
 Mount Savage Middle School, Mount Savage
 Washington Middle School, Cumberland
 Westmar Middle School, Lonaconing

Elementary schools
 Beall Elementary School, Frostburg
 Bel Air Elementary School, Cumberland
 Cash Valley Elementary School, LaVale
 Cresaptown Elementary School, Cresaptown
 Flintstone Elementary School, Flintstone
 Frost Elementary School, Frostburg
 George's Creek Elementary School, Lonaconing
 John Humbird Elementary School, Cumberland
 Mount Savage Elementary School, Mount Savage
 Northeast Elementary School, Cumberland
 Parkside Elementary School, LaVale
 South Penn Elementary School, Cumberland
 West Side Elementary School, Cumberland
 Westernport Elementary School, Westernport

Vocational schools
 Center for Career and Technical Education, Cresaptown

Other schools
 Eckhart Alternative, Eckhart Mines

External links
 Official site

School districts in Maryland
 Facebook
Education in Allegany County, Maryland